The Dunkettle Interchange is a major road junction in Glanmire, to the east of Cork City, Ireland. It forms a junction between the M8, N25 and the N40.  The junction is currently a four-arm signalised junction with a flyover, allowing traffic travelling in an east–west axis to avoid having to use the roundabout.  On average, 95,000 vehicles use the junction on a daily basis. As of 2018, a further civil engineering upgrade to make the interchange work on a freeflow basis was being undertaken by Sisk, with a proposed completion date of 2022.

It should not be confused with the Dunkettle Roundabout which is around 750m to the west.

History

Initial developments
The Dunkettle Interchange was constructed in order to link the N25 to the newly constructed Glanmire bypass which formed part of the N8 at Dunkettle.  The junction opened in 1992 along with the Glanmire bypass. At the time, the junction had three arms, along with two access sliproads to allow access to and from Glounthaune.

A further significant upgrade came in 1999 when, in the order to facilitate the opening of the new Jack Lynch Tunnel, a fourth arm heading southbound was added. At the same time, a flyover of the roundabout was added to accommodate increased traffic levels. Access slip roads into and out of Little Island were also added along with access to the tunnel management building.

A further upgrade was completed in 2006.  This involved installing traffic lights on the roundabout in order to increase the capacity of the junction.

Further changes
Due to the volumes of traffic using the junction on a daily basis, the National Roads Authority (NRA) and Cork County Council decided that the junction was unfit for purpose. Jacobs Engineering was appointed by the NRA to create plans to make the junction free-flow in all movements. In June 2011, the NRA presented five different solutions to create a free-flow junction, and in 2013, a scheme was approved by the planning board.

By September 2015, a Capital Investment Plan was unveiled by the Irish government, which secured funding for the interchange. By July 2018, Sisk had been selected by Transport Infrastructure Ireland (TII) as the main contractor. As of late 2022, these works were ongoing.

References

External links
 Dunkettle Interchange upgrade website
 Dunkettle Traffic live traffic camera feeds

Roads in County Cork
Road interchanges in the Republic of Ireland